The magnetic flux, represented by the symbol , threading some contour or loop is defined as the magnetic field  multiplied by the loop area , i.e. . Both  and  can be arbitrary, meaning  can be as well. However, if one deals with the superconducting loop or a hole in a bulk superconductor, the magnetic flux threading such a hole/loop is quantized.
The (superconducting) magnetic flux quantum  ≈  is a combination of fundamental physical constants: the Planck constant  and the electron charge . Its value is, therefore, the same for any superconductor.
The phenomenon of flux quantization was discovered experimentally by B. S. Deaver and W. M. Fairbank and, independently, by R. Doll and M. Näbauer, in 1961. The quantization of magnetic flux is closely related to the Little–Parks effect, but was predicted earlier by Fritz London in 1948 using a phenomenological model.

The inverse of the flux quantum, is called the Josephson constant, and is denoted J. It is the constant of proportionality of the Josephson effect, relating the potential difference across a Josephson junction to the frequency of the irradiation. The Josephson effect is very widely used to provide a standard for high-precision measurements of potential difference, which (from 1990 to 2019) were related to a fixed, conventional value of the Josephson constant, denoted J-90.  With the 2019 redefinition of SI base units, the Josephson constant has an exact value of J = , which replaces the conventional value J-90.

Introduction 
The following physical equations use SI units. In CGS units, a factor of  would appear.

The superconducting properties in each point of the superconductor are described by the complex quantum mechanical wave function  — the superconducting order parameter. Changing the phase  by  will not change  and, correspondingly, will not change any physical properties. However, in the superconductor of non-trivial topology, e.g. superconductor with the hole or superconducting loop/cylinder, the phase  may continuously change from some value  to the value  as one goes around the hole/loop and comes to the same starting point. If this is so, then one has  magnetic flux quanta trapped in the hole/loop, as shown below:

Per minimal coupling, the current density of Cooper pairs in the superconductor is:

where  is the charge of the Cooper pair.
The wave function is the Ginzburg–Landau order parameter:

Plugged into the expression of the current, one obtains:

Inside the body of the superconductor, the current density J is zero, and therefore

Integrating around the hole/loop using Stokes' theorem and  gives:

Now, because the order parameter must return to the same value when the integral goes back to the same point, we have:

Due to the Meissner effect, the magnetic induction  inside the superconductor is zero. More exactly, magnetic field  penetrates into a superconductor over a small distance called London's magnetic field penetration depth (denoted  and usually ). The screening currents also flow in this -layer near the surface, creating magnetization  inside the superconductor, which perfectly compensates the applied field , thus resulting in  inside the superconductor.

The magnetic flux frozen in a loop/hole (plus its -layer) will always be quantized. There are geometries where this condition cannot be satisfied, e.g. a loop made of very thin superconducting wire or the cylinder with the similar wall thickness.

The flux quantization is a key idea behind a SQUID, which is one of the most sensitive magnetometers available.

Flux quantization also plays an important role in the physics of type II superconductors. When such a superconductor (now without any holes) is placed in a magnetic field with the strength between the first critical field  and the second critical field , the field partially penetrates into the superconductor in a form of Abrikosov vortices. The normal core plays a role of a hole in the superconducting phase. The magnetic field lines pass along this normal core through the whole sample. The screening currents circulate in the  -vicinity of the core and screen the rest of the superconductor from the magnetic field in the core. In total, each such Abrikosov vortex carries one quantum of magnetic flux .

Measuring the magnetic flux
Prior to the 2019 redefinition of the SI base units, the magnetic flux quantum was measured with great precision by exploiting the Josephson effect. When coupled with the measurement of the von Klitzing constant , this provided the most accurate values of Planck's constant  obtained until 2019. This may be counterintuitive, since  is generally associated with the behavior of microscopically small systems, whereas the quantization of magnetic flux in a superconductor and the quantum Hall effect are both emergent phenomena associated with thermodynamically large numbers of particles.

As a result of the 2019 redefinition of the SI base units, the Planck constant  has a fixed value  which, together with the definitions of the second and the metre, provides the official definition of the kilogram. Therefore, both the Josephson constant  and the von Klitzing constant  have fixed values, and the Josephson effect along with the von Klitzing quantum Hall effect becomes the primary mise en pratique for the definition of the ampere and other electric units in the SI.

See also
Brian Josephson
Committee on Data for Science and Technology
Domain wall (magnetism)
Flux pinning
Ginzburg–Landau theory
Husimi Q representation
Macroscopic quantum phenomena
Magnetic domain
Magnetic monopole
Quantum vortex
Topological defect
von Klitzing constant

References 

Superconductivity
Quantum magnetism
Metrology
Physical constants